Antonius Wilhelmus Maria "Toon" Becx (21 April 1920 − 26 November 2013) was a Dutch footballer who played for Willem II, primarily as a left winger.

Club career
Known as a free-kick specialist with a fierce shot, Becx played his entire career for Willem II, scoring 113 goals in 329 matches. He made his debut in the 1939–40 season, won two Dutch league titles with them under legendary Czech coach František Fadrhonc (the first Dutch professional league title in 1955) and formed a prolific strike force with Jan van Roessel and Piet de Jong.

Personal life
During the Second World War he was forced to work in Germany.

Death
Toon Becx died on 26 November 2013, aged 93, in Tilburg, North Brabant.

Honours
Eredivisie: 2
 1952, 1955

References

1920 births
2013 deaths
Footballers from Tilburg
Association football wingers
Dutch footballers
Willem II (football club) players
Dutch World War II forced labourers